Ridgewell is a village in England.

Ridgewell may also refer to:

People
Derek Ridgewell (1945–1982), corrupt British Transport Police officer
Kathy Ridgewell-Williams (born 1965), American soccer player
Liam Ridgewell (born 1984), English footballer
Lilian Ridgewell (1912–1970), English gymnast
Samantha Ridgewell (born 1996), Canadian ice hockey player
TomSka (Thomas Ridgewell; born 1990), English filmmaker

Other uses
Ridgewell (comics), a fictional character from The Adventures of Tintin
RAF Ridgewell, a Royal Air Force station in Ridgewell

See also
George Ridgwell (1867–1935), British screenwriter and film director 
Ridgwell Cullum (Sidney Burghard; 1867–1943), British novelist